Three Black men were Lynched in Kirvin, Texas for allegedly murdering a young girl. According to the United States Senate Committee on the Judiciary it was the 19th of 61 lynchings during 1922 in the United States.

Background

On May 4, 1922, on the last day of school in Kirvin, Texas, 17-year-old Eula Ausley was on her way home from school when she was grabbed from her horse, sexually assaulted and then horribly mutilated.  Her absence was noticed and a search party was sent out. They came across the body and the search party turned into a posse of 1,000 men armed with whatever weapon they had. Eula Ausley's family was in a feud with another family and the local Sheriff Horace Mayo already had two white suspects of that family in custody when the wife of McKinley "Snap" Curry told the Sheriff that he had suspiciously come home with blood on his clothes. The Sheriff changed the course of the investigation and arrested Curry. Under interrogation, he implicated two other men, Johnny Cornish (19) and Mose Jones (46). The three were arrested and held in jail.

Lynching

At midnight of May 6, the mob forced its way into the prison and dragged the three men out of the jail. The men were tortured on a lot between the old Baptist Church and the Methodist Church in Kirvin. Some reports state that they were castrated but at least two were burned alive. The victims were forced to watch as the others were tied to a plow, had wood stacked around them, doused with gasoline and lit on fire.

One paper reported that Tom Cornish was hanged from a tree.

Aftermath
The two white men, Claude and Audey Prowell, who were initially arrested, were released and the sheriff released a statement that they were not involved in the murder of Eula Ausley. Author Monte Akers in his book Flames After Midnight: Murder, Vengeance and the Desolation of a Texas Community, concluded that McKinley "Snap" Curry conspired with Claude and Audey Prowell to kill Eula Ausley and that Mose Jones and Johnny Cornish were innocent.

Bibliography 
Notes

References 
 - Total pages: 274

1922 riots
1922 in Texas
African-American history of Texas
Lynching deaths in Texas 
February 1922 events
Protest-related deaths
Racially motivated violence against African Americans 
Riots and civil disorder in Texas 
White American riots in the United States